Chikkenakoppa is a village in the Yelburga taluk of Koppal district in the Indian state of Karnataka.

See also
Lakkundi
Itagi

References

Villages in Koppal district